Elder Jacob O. Meyer (November 11, 1934 – April 9, 2010) was the founder, president and directing elder of the Assemblies of Yahweh. Among his roles he was also a farmer, broadcaster, translator, preacher, counselor and writer and considered by the Assemblies of Yahweh to be a scholar, rabbi and spiritual leader. He taught classes at Dalet School and Obadiah School of the Bible, as well as pioneering and editing two monthly magazines, The Narrow Way and The Sacred Name Broadcaster.

He was instrumental in uniting the worship of Yahweh into one cohesive group doctrinally and was known for coining the terms Messianic and Spiritual Israelites for its adherents. The Assemblies of Yahweh distances itself from the Sacred Name Movement.

Meyers' roots 

Meyer's family came from Germany in 1717, when Johannes Meyer came to inspect the prospects of the New World. After selling his possessions in Germany, he returned to the U.S with the entire family, settling 40 miles south of present-day Bethel and 40 miles west of Philadelphia, in Lancaster County. In 1732 he bought 500 acres of land, 10 miles west of Bethel at Fredericksburg, and moved onto the homestead about 1740. Meyers' grandfather came east to Berlin County, where he married a young girl from the area, and bought a farm two miles South of Bethel. It was here where Meyer was born in 1934.

Early life 

Meyer was born in Bethel, Berks County, Pennsylvania. He grew up in a conservative, religious Pennsylvania Dutch family, and was active in his local Anabaptist congregation. He studied at the Evangelical Congregational School of Theology (now the Evangelical Seminary) in Myerstown, Pennsylvania. Meyer attended theological college, conducted meetings and coordinated biblical classes at the institutes he attended. Meyer later also attended Dropsie University in Philadelphia and Johns Hopkins University in Baltimore.

Meyer first learned about the Sacred Name in the late 1950s and taught by an ordained minister of a prominent denomination during a course in Biblical studies. Meyer decided to herald these truths to the world, refusing to keep the sacred Names hidden among Hebrew-speaking scholars. According to this teaching, the true name of God was Yahweh. Meyer and his wife began to look for religious groups who followed this belief, including Sacred Name groups.

Their efforts to locate any such organization were unsuccessful, and therefore Meyer began to formulate a plan in which the Meyer family would isolate themselves from the world, save their tithes and finally send a "one time herald" message via a newspaper article or some other means. Meyer came to believe this was "not the will of Yahweh" and turned once again to seek other groups who were willing to help spread his message. Meyer stumbled across some Sacred Name groups, but believed their teachings contained doctrinal errors. Meyer helped to publish the Sacred Name Herald, after which he returned to Bethel in 1964. It was in 1965, when following a radio message, that Meyer was asked to begin an assembly type organisation, to which Meyer agreed "If it be Yahweh's will." At this point a 30-year-old Meyer was anointed with oil, and the Assemblies of Yahweh emerged. Meyer points out that this age was the time when priests were installed to do the work of Yahweh in the Hebrew Scriptures.

Ruth F. Meyer
Elder Jacob O. Meyer met Ruth Meyer on the first day of High School.  Her family had moved from Lancaster County in 1945 and settled northeast of Bethel Both Elder Meyer and  Ruth Meyer have always had an interest in the Bible, but that interest grew after they got married with the knowledge of the Sacred Names in 1962 and the importance of keeping all the commandments.    At the beginning of the ministry it was just Elder Meyer, Ruth Meyer and their children. In 1965 Elder Meyer was anointed into the ministry, and he in turn anointed his wife and children. Ruth Meyer was instrumental in assisting both Elder Meyer and the Assemblies of Yahweh during the early days of the ministry, as well as throughout the ongoing years of the ministry. As mentioned in the Sacred Name Broadcaster of June 2018, Volume L, Number 3 issue, Ruth Meyer served as sound ‘recording technician, receptionist, secretary, typist, mail clerk and printing assistant, as well as his chief cook’. All of this was voluntary work that she put in to the ministry to assist the Assemblies of Yahweh. As well as this, Ruth Meyer served as an advisor to Elder Meyer and was consulted when initiating the project of the Sacred Name Broadcaster, as well as other major projects. It was Ruth Meyer that printed the original covers of the Sacred Name Broadcaster  and delivered the first copy of the magazine to Elder Meyer  in the Summer of 1968. Ruth Meyer also accompanied Elder Meyer to Israel to study over there. Ruth Meyer continues to serve as the Head Deaconess in the Assemblies of Yahweh and is praised for her many contributions and sacrifice to help forward the ministry. She also serves as overseer of the bread making process prior to the Feast of Unleavened Bread.

Assemblies of Yahweh 

As head ("directing elder") of the Assemblies of Yahweh, Meyer became a full-time minister in 1970. At some point in the 1970s he undertook a short part-time course leading to the award of an associate degree from Thomas Edison State College. The name "Assemblies of Yahweh" comes from the Hebrew name of the worshippers of Yahweh in the Hebrew Scriptures, the Quhal Yahweh. Deuteronomy 23:1–8 contains the phrase six times, while in other places the assembly is called the Edah Yahweh, translated as the "called out ones" by Christian groups (A Theology of the New Testament, page 107).

Significance of Meyer's name 

In the Bible, Jacob (Yaʿăqōḇ) is the name of the patriarch of the Israelites and means a supplanter or a heel grabber whereas Meyer means enlightener or "one who shines". Meyer sometimes mentioned the significance of his name and traced his and his wife's ancestry to the Apostolic Assembly. Jacob was also the name of the bishop of the Apostolic Assembly in the New Testament, the brother of Jesus.

Works 

Meyer counselled numerous of people at no cost, offering advice and sometimes taking calls well in to the night to help and pray with members. Meyer also performed weddings and funerals and visited the sick and in foreign countries, as well as carrying out anointing for those who requested it. He performed baptisms all around the world, in rivers, lakes, pools and the sea. Meyer also visited those in prisons who had an interest in repentance and conversion. As a farmer, he was also known for his generosity, giving away free food to those who might have had difficulties obtaining it and feeding numerous people. Meyer also taught at Obadiah School of the Bible for free, although they were administrative costs they were small and Meyer could have obtained large sums had he charged the amounts lecturers charge in Universities. Meyer gave away hundreds of pieces of literature for free, claiming that he wanted to make the truth available to as many people as possible. The Assemblies of Yahweh have continued in this endeavor, sending free literature to those who might have financial difficulties. During what is known as the third tithe year, Meyer was able to help a number of members who had financial difficulties.

Missionary journeys 

Meyer has been a prolific writer in magazines, translator of the conservative Sacred Name Bible, the Sacred Scriptures Bethel Edition and the completion of several books. Meyer has also traveled worldwide distributing literature and visiting those who had shown an interest in the ministry. This includes North and South America, Germany, Berlin, France, Poland, England, Ireland, the Philippines, Thailand, India, Trinidad, Dominica, St. Lucia and Israel. During some of these journeys he was accompanied by his wife.

Awards 

Meyer was awarded a tribute on March 21, 2004, for over 40 years of dedication and fortitude, to send the message of the ministry out in to the world. Meyer served as board member of the National Association of Shortwave Broadcasting, and was nominated as township constable in Philadelphia, a position which he had not sought.

Teaching 

Meyer taught more than 5,000 sermons in his lifetime, preaching on the following subjects extensively. Below are the main teachings espoused by the Assemblies of Yahweh through Meyer.

Commandment-keeping 

The main theme or subject of all sermons preached by Meyer was that of commandment keeping. The ethos of the Assemblies of Yahweh being one of law, this would fall in line with this as well as the ministry's Statement of Doctrine, written by Meyer. Meyer would focus some sermons specifically on the subject of a law (especially from the Ten Commandments), such as in the sermon "Thou Shall Not Commit Adultery", where he would cover all the points related to the law such as the New Testament and Old Testament references and the implications of the law in our lives, magnifying the law to encompass every aspect of our lives. However these deeper analyses of specific laws usually were written out as articles in The Sacred Name Broadcaster.

Some examples of subjects covered by commandment-keeping are the holy days, the dietary laws, tithing, correct speech, repentance etc. Meyer preached against every form of evil and sin through the law.

Some examples of sermon titles on this subject are included below:
 "Zealous repentance"
 "Sin Brings Yahweh's Judgment"
 "What Must I Do To Be Saved"
 "The Priceless Core Commandments"

Spirituality 

Meyer was considered to be a great spiritual leader by the Assemblies of Yahweh. He taught sermons on the subject of spirituality which many times focused on prayer, quiet study and introspection. In other words, taking the time to focus on Yahweh and things which would bring us closer to Yahweh. An examination of the fruits of the Spirit were many times focused upon and contrasted against the works of the flesh. In the series, "A New Young Israel Emerges", Meyer compares the Israelites who took the Promised Land to the Assemblies of Yahweh, whereas the Israelites who died in the wilderness were unspiritual people. Spirituality also can relate to sermons regarding zeal, good works and holy spirit characteristics.

Some examples of sermon titles on this subject are included below:
 "The Spirit of Fruitfulness"
 "Orientated Toward the Spiritual Goal"
 "Characteristics of a Spiritual Obedient Nation"

Love 

Meyer would always preach the first message of the Feast of Tabernacles on love. Usually when preaching about love Meyer would concentrate on the terms agape and philadelphia (Φιλαδελφία) focusing more on the latter. Meyer did not believe in Christianity's concept of love. The Assemblies of Yahweh teaches that only by keeping the commandments of Yahweh can we comprehend what love truly is, as Yahweh's loving character is contained in the law. Also tied in to this subject is that of unity and how love engenders unity. Meyer taught how we are to show love to Yahweh through sermons like "Loving Yahweh from the heart" (2008) and "how to show love to our fellow men". Meyer would especially speak of the love of the brethren in the Narrow Way publications.

Some examples of sermon titles on this subject are included below:
 "Love—the perfect bond"
 "A Glorious Assembly"
 "Philadelphia—Living the Kingdom Way of Life" (2006)

Faith 

Most of the sermons preached by Meyer at least touched on the subject of faith, even in sermons preached, such as "Remembrance Brings Rejoicing". Meyer would recall his own faith and his unshakable belief in the authority and authenticity of the Bible, as well as the ability of Yahweh to do all things and the ministries ability to complete the Great Commission. Sometimes Meyer would devote whole sermons to the subject of faith such as in the sermon "Fear of Faith" (1993). Meyer would retell the miracles he had personally seen within the ministry in sermons preached regarding the history of the Assemblies of Yahweh.

Prophecy 

Meyer would often preach a weekly Sabbath sermon regarding end-time prophecy, comparing trends of the day with what is predicted in the Bible, proving from the Bible we are in the end times such as in the series "Age Ending Events Surveyed" (2006). This would be done by identifying the violations of the law in society and all around the world, especially those stories which had made news headlines, preaching strongly against the evil conduct of the age and calling for repentance.

Some claim Meyer was a prophet, although he did not set any dates for Bible prophecies to take place based on Matthew 25:13. Meyer believed in preparing the Assemblies of Yahweh for what is known as the tribulation. Many sermons were on prophecy relating to the coming Beast System mentioned in Revelation, as well but to a lesser extent, the coming Kingdom. Meyer would many times end his message with the encouraging proclamation "On to the Kingdom".

Some of Meyer's sermons on end time prophecy are below:
 "A Great Commission to Fulfil"
 "The Last Days in Bible Prophesy"
 "The Spectre of the Coming Beast System"
 "Yahweh's Message of Doom and Hope"

Piety 

Meyer stressed sanctification, holiness, dedication and the importance of avoiding pagan worldly customs and practices (such as Easter, Halloween and Christmas). Additionally, Meyer spoke out against things like worldly dress styles, calling for modesty and high standards in the worship of Yahweh such as formal dress on the holy days. The Assemblies of Yahweh continue to uphold these teachings. In the series Meyer preached called "Become An Iconoclast" for example, Meyer expresses the need to resist worldliness and worldly customs as did the Maccabees. Preceding the Three Pilgrimage Festivals, Meyer would instruct the leadership to focus their attention on sermons that would help purify the Assemblies of Yahweh in anticipation of the approaching holy day such as with the sermon "Let Us Wash Our Hearts".

Some of Meyer's sermons on the subject of piety and purity are below:
 "A True Israelite"
 "Yahshua's Untarnished Character"
 "What Is Hidden In Your Heart"
 "All Things Must Be Pure"

Instructions 

Meyer taught the Assemblies of Yahweh to learn and then recite the Shema three times a day, as well as have a daily Bible reading program which allows adherents to read through the Bible in one year and set scriptures to open and close the Sabbath with, as was Meyers instruction. The congregation would stand for Meyer when he left or entered a building out of respect as per the instruction in Leviticus 19:32 and this was encouraged by the Work of the Ministry. The format for services have stayed more or less the same for over fifty years with a mini-sermon about 30 minutes in length, followed by a main sermon of about 90 minutes. The main sermon is usually a chosen pre-recorded sermon by Meyer. Songs and spiritual offerings are encouraged, but music has to be approved by the music director. Meyer also came up with the theme song of the Assemblies of Yahweh, Under Zion's Banner based on the Battle Hymn of the Republic. As outlined in his will, his faithful children continue to lead the Assemblies of Yahweh in his stead and the leadership will alternate each week to preach the mini sermon on the Sabbath. Meyer's sermons and writings are re-played and re-published within the organisation up to the present day. When referring to Jacob O. Meyer in the ministry, the honorific "of blessed memory" (or O.B.M) is used after his name, possibly based on Proverbs 10:7.

Meyer's will 

In Meyer's will, he outlined his desire that the Assemblies of Yahweh attain to and remain as Philadelphia, stating:

Meyer's sermons and literature are still used copiously within the ministry. His sermons are still broadcast on WMLK and streamed on Tunein.com. He died peacefully at age 75 in 2010; the ministry is now run by his faithful children.

See also 

 Names of God in Christianity
 Names of God in Judaism
 Yahshua

References 

1934 births
2010 deaths
20th-century translators
American religious leaders
Assemblies of Yahweh
American Anabaptists
Pennsylvania Dutch people
People from Berks County, Pennsylvania
Thomas Edison State University alumni
Translators of the Bible into English
Sacred Name Movement